Thyreus garouensis is a cleptoparasitic species of bee from Northern Cameroon in Central Africa. It belongs to the genus of Thyreus, whose members are often referred to as cuckoo bees, and to the family Apidae.

References

Endemic fauna of Cameroon
Apinae